Me Too is the second album released by UK band Farrah.

Track listing 

Tongue Tied
Daytime TV
He Gives an Inch
The One That Got Away
This Is My Life
Hopelessly Devoted
First and Last
It's Different for Girls
Half as Strong
Wake Up
School Disco (Japanese Version only) 
The Last Word
Nigel (Japanese Version only)
High and Low

Notes
It's Different for Girls is a cover version of the song originally written and performed by Joe Jackson.
The album was released on vinyl in Japan with alternative artwork.

2004 albums
Farrah (band) albums
Lojinx albums